Escuro River or Rio Escuro (Portuguese for dark river) may refer to:

 Escuro River (Minas Gerais), Brazil
 Escuro River (Tocantins), Brazil